Marit Elisebet Totland (born 1957) is a Norwegian politician for the Christian Democratic Party.

She was elected to Bømlo municipality council in 1991, and became mayor in 1995. She still held that post when in 1997, during the first cabinet Bondevik, she was appointed State Secretary in the Ministry of Church Affairs, Education and Research. She lost that post with the cabinet change in 2000. In 2007 she was elected to Kvinnherad municipality council.

References
Marit Elisebet Totland statssekretær i Kyrkje-, utdannings- og forskingsdepartementet - Regjeringen.no 

1957 births
Living people
Christian Democratic Party (Norway) politicians
Mayors of places in Hordaland
Norwegian state secretaries
Women mayors of places in Norway
20th-century Norwegian women politicians
20th-century Norwegian politicians
21st-century Norwegian women politicians
21st-century Norwegian politicians
Women government ministers of Norway
Norwegian women state secretaries